Zollie Coffer Wright (September 17, 1909 – April 12, 1976) was an American Negro league outfielder in the 1930s and 1940s.

A native of Milford, Texas, Wright attended Paul Quinn College. He made his Negro leagues debut in 1931 for the Memphis Red Sox. As a member of the Washington Elite Giants in 1936, Wright was selected to play in the East–West All-Star Game. He died in Philadelphia, Pennsylvania in 1976 at age 66.

References

External links
 and Baseball-Reference Black Baseball stats and Seamheads

1909 births
1976 deaths
Columbus Elite Giants players
Memphis Red Sox players
Monroe Monarchs players
New Orleans Crescent Stars players
New York Black Yankees players
Philadelphia Stars players
Washington Black Senators players
Washington Elite Giants players
Baseball outfielders
20th-century African-American sportspeople